The National Association of Wesleyan Evangelicals is a Wesleyan-Holiness Christian network of churches and ministers concentrated mostly in the Southern United States.

The association claims seven member congregations and a handful of individual members, affiliated house churches, and ministries—most of which were formerly part of the Evangelical Methodist Church's now-dissolved Southern District. (It is not an association of denominations like the similarly named National Association of Evangelicals.) It has been headquartered in Carrollton, Georgia, since 2010 and officially formed in 2011 at its first annual meeting.

Background

The National Association of Wesleyan Evangelicals (NAWE) was formed in the wake of longstanding disagreements regarding congregationalism in its parent body, the Evangelical Methodist Church (EMC).

Evangelical Methodism began in 1946 as "a double protest against what were considered autocratic and undemocratic government on the one hand and a tendency toward modernism on the other in the Methodist Church." The predominant body which grew out of this movement was the EMC denomination, founded in 1946 and led by Dr. J. H. Hamblen, who had previously faced Methodist church-law charges after forming an independent house-based congregation during a sabbatical.

The EMC was founded as a "congregational-connectional" association of churches with a goal of restoring American Methodism to its Wesleyan and Holiness movement roots, as well as subsequent revivalist practices.

Disagreements over congregational power and denominational control have led to many disputes and fractures, starting with the exodus of the congregationalist Evangelical Methodist Church of America in 1952. This disagreement reached a fever pitch in 2007 when plans were announced to centralize the U.S. districts of the EMC into a single entity, and expand the powers of the General Superintendent into a bishop-like role, complete with introducing this title as an alternative term for superintendent. The Southern District of the EMC disapproved of the changes at a 2008 conference.

The EMC's General Conference entered into legal action, and then court-ordered arbitration, with dissenting churches who wished to disaffiliate with the EMC because of these changes. Most of the Southern District churches which formed the NAWE simply dropped "Evangelical Methodist" from their name while retaining their property following the conclusion of the arbitration.

NAWE advertises itself as "an association, not a denomination" to "come alongside pastors and their congregations to help them better serve their communities." The small network has developed a six-step course of study for lay certification and ordination, youth missions outings, and an annual pastors and wives retreat.

The association maintains a standard Evangelical and Wesleyan theological stance, with a modest Wesleyan-Holiness statement on sanctification: "We believe that there is a sanctifying experience available to all believers that is received by grace through faith on the condition of the believer’s total surrender to God and His will."

The Association of Independent Methodists shares a close working relationship with the NAWE.

References

External links
National Association of Wesleyan Evangelicals web site

Christian organizations established in 2011
Methodist denominations in North America
Holiness denominations
2011 establishments in the United States